A referendum on amendments in the pensions law was held in Latvia on 23 August 2008. It failed due to low turnout, as 453,730 votes (half of the votes cast in the previous parliamentary election) would have been necessary to make it valid. If it had succeeded, minimum pensions would have been tied (until the end of 2009) to the government-set subsistence benefit level with a higher coefficient than earlier, in effect tripling the minimum pension from 50 lati to at least 135 lati. The referendum was strongly supported by an organisation called Society for Different Politics, which aimed to become a political party.

Results

References

External links
The amendment voted on

2008 in Latvia
Latvia
Referendums in Latvia
Retirement in Latvia
Pension referendums
August 2008 events in Europe